KYWH (88.9 FM, "The River") is a radio station broadcasting an adult album alternative format. Licensed to Lockwood, Montana, United States, the station serves the Billings area. The station is currently owned by Fresh Life Church, Inc.

History
The station began broadcasting in 2006, and was owned by CSN International, airing a Christian format. In 2008, CSN International sold KYWH, along with a number of other stations, to Calvary Radio Network, Inc. These stations were sold to Calvary Chapel Costa Mesa later that year. In 2011, the station was sold to Fresh Life Church for $100,000.

On May 5, 2021, KYWH changed their format from Christian to adult album alternative, branded as "The River". While the station is still owned by Fresh Life Church, KYWH's operations are now managed by Mike Summers of Wasatch Community Media, who founded and/or programmed several Alternative music stations in Salt Lake City (95.5 KJQN, KXRK X96, 107.9 later 101.9 KENZ The End, 91.9 KPCW and 107.9 KUMT The Mountain).

References

External links
KYWH's official website

YWH
Radio stations established in 2006
2006 establishments in Montana
Adult album alternative radio stations in the United States